Busu may refer to:

Busu, Indonesia, a village on Halmahera, Indonesia
Busu languages
Busu, a village in Grecești Commune, Dolj County, Romania
Brock University Students' Union
Busu Dima, a festival of the Dimasa Kachari tribe of India